Juan Sebastián Cabal and Robert Farah were the defending champions, but lost in the final to Pablo Carreño Busta and Pablo Cuevas, 4–6, 7–5, [8–10].

Seeds

Draw

Draw

Qualifying

Seeds

Qualifiers
  Facundo Bagnis /  Gastão Elias

Qualifying draw

References
 Main draw
 Qualifying draw

Rio Open - Doubles
Rio
Rio Open